The 2004-05 Thai Premier League had 10 teams. Two clubs would be relegated as the league would be expanded to 12 teams for the 2006 season. Two teams promoted from the rival Provincial League and two clubs from Thailand Division 1 League. The team that finished in 8th position would play in a relegation play-off.

Member clubs

 Bangkok Bank
 Bangkok University
 BEC Tero Sasana
 Krung Thai Bank
 Osotsapa M-150
 Port Authority of Thailand
 Provincial Electricity Authority (promoted from Division 1)
 Royal Thai Navy
 Thailand Tobacco Monopoly
 TOT (promoted from Division 1)

Final league table

Kings Trophy

The King's Trophy was an end of season match between the two clubs that finished first and second in the final Premier League standings.

Thailand Tobacco Monopoly, who won the Premier League, beat league runners up Provincial Electricity Authority 4-1.

Queens Cup

The Queen's Cup was postponed because of lack of sponsorship, will be held next year but with reduced prize money.

Asian Representation

  In the 2005 Asian Champions League, a competition described as ''competition restricted to 14 countries considered 'mature' in the so-called 'Vision Asia' paper of AFC President Mohamed Bin Hammam. The so-called 14 'developing' countries have their clubs relegated to the AFC Cup, while the clubs from the 'emerging' countries are dumped into the new Presidents Cup.
BEC Tero Sasana and Krung Thai Bank would again be the Thai representatives and would also fail to qualify for the knockout stages. Krung Thai once again came in second place in their group, but a full 9 points behind group winners Busan I'Park. BEC would once again slump to bottom position on 1 point.
Thailand Tobacco Monopoly took part in the 2nd edition of ASEAN Club Championship this season but failed to make it out of the group stage, drawing one game and losing the other two games.

Annual awards

Coach of the Year

 Jose Alves Borges - Thailand Tobacco Monopoly

Player of the year

 José Carlos Da Silva - Thailand Tobacco Monopoly

Top scorer

 Supakit Jinajai - 10 Goals Provincial Electricity Authority
 Sarayoot Chaikamdee - 10 Goals Port Authority of Thailand

Champions

References

Thailand 2004/05 RSSSF

External links
Official Website

Thai League, 2004-05
1
1
Thai League 1 seasons